Rina Tatsukawa (born 14 July 1996) is a Japanese judoka.

She is the gold medallist of the 2021 Judo Grand Slam Baku in the -48 kg category.

References

External links
 

1996 births
Living people
Japanese female judoka
21st-century Japanese women